This is a list of parliaments in Fiji.

See also
 Parliament of Fiji

Notes

Government of Fiji
Politics of Fiji
History of Fiji
Fiji politics-related lists